Roncalli High School is a private, Roman Catholic high school in Aberdeen, South Dakota.  It is located in the Roman Catholic Diocese of Sioux Falls.

Background
Roncalli High School is named after Pope John XXIII, born Angelo Giuseppe Roncalli.

Athletics
Roncalli is a member of the South Dakota High School Activities Association.  They have won the following SDHSAA State Championships:

 Boys Football - 2005, 2006 (Runner-Up - 1987)
 Boys Basketball - 1975, 2015 
 Boys Tennis - none (Runner-Up - 1977)
 Boys Golf - 2004, 2015, 2017 (Runner-up - 2002, 2007)
 Boys Track and Field - 2006
 Girls Basketball - 2021
 Girls Volleyball - 2002
 Girls Track and Field - none (Runner-Up - 2005)

Dacotah Bank Stadium is the home venue for all Roncalli football games.

References

External links
 School website

Roman Catholic Diocese of Sioux Falls
Catholic secondary schools in South Dakota
Educational institutions established in 1964
Buildings and structures in Aberdeen, South Dakota
Schools in Brown County, South Dakota
1964 establishments in South Dakota
Sports teams in Aberdeen, South Dakota